"" (On the breeze...What a gentle little Zephyr) is a duettino, or a short duet, from act 3, scene X, of Wolfgang Amadeus Mozart's 1786 opera The Marriage of Figaro, K. 492, to a libretto by Lorenzo Da Ponte. In the duettino, Countess Almaviva (a soprano) dictates to Susanna (also a soprano) the invitation to a tryst addressed to the countess' husband in a plot to expose his infidelity.

Music

The duet is scored for oboe, bassoon, and strings. Its time signature is 6/8, its key is B-flat major, and it is 62 bars long; the tempo indication is allegretto. During the first part of the duet (bars 1–37), the Contessa dictates the title and the three lines of the letter and, after a pause, Susanna repeats the lines as she writes them. In the second part, the Contessa and Susanna read alternate lines with a slight overlap (bars 38–45) until they finish in a true duet with their conclusion. The duet has a vocal range from F4 to B5 for Susanna and from D4 to G5 for the Contessa.

Libretto 

The dialogue, without the re-reading of the letter:
{|
|-
|Contessa:||Canzonetta sull'aria...||A little song on the breeze...
|-
|Susanna:|||Sull'aria...||On the breeze...
|-
|Contessa:||Che soave zeffiretto...||What a gentle little Zephyr...
|-
|Susanna:||Zeffiretto...||A little Zephyr...
|-
|Contessa:||Questa sera spirerà...||This evening will sigh...
|-
|Susanna:||Questa sera spirerà...||This evening will sigh...
|-
|Contessa:||Sotto i pini del boschetto.||Under the pines in the little grove.
|-
|Susanna:||Sotto i pini...||Under the pines...
|-
|Contessa:||Sotto i pini del boschetto.||Under the pines in the little grove.
|-
|Susanna:||Sotto i pini...del boschetto...||Under the pines...in the little grove....
|-
|Contessa:||Ei già il resto capirà.||And the rest he'll understand.
|-
|Susanna/Contessa:||Certo, certo il capirà.||Certainly, certainly he'll understand.
|}
Both then re-read the letter.

In popular culture 
In the 1994 film, The Shawshank Redemption, prisoner Andy Dufresne defies Warden Sam Norton by playing an excerpt of this song over the prison's public address system. Norton sentences Dufresne to solitary confinement as a result. Ellis Boyd "Red" Redding remarks in his voice-over narration: "I have no idea to this day what those two Italian ladies were singing about. ... I'd like to think they were singing about something so beautiful it can't be expressed in words, and it makes your heart ache because of it." This is ironic as the opera characters are singing about a duplicitous love letter to expose infidelity, and Dufresne's wife's affair is the event which indirectly leads to his imprisonment. The duettino, sung by the sopranos Edith Mathis and Gundula Janowitz, appeared in the film's soundtrack. It was nominated as one of 400 songs in consideration for the American Film Institute's list of 100 top movie songs, although it did not win a place on the list. The video game Lego City Undercover also features the aria in the third chapter of the game's story, when protagonist Chase McCain plays it on the prison's intercom, in a parody of The Shawshank Redemption.

References

External links 

"Sull'aria...che soave zeffiretto", orchestral score with Italian and German text (larger version)
Libretto in Italian/English side-by-side

Compositions by Wolfgang Amadeus Mozart
Opera excerpts
1786 compositions
1786 songs
The Marriage of Figaro